The name Erika was used for five tropical cyclones in the Atlantic Ocean. The name replaced Elena which was retired after the 1985 season.

 Tropical Storm Erika (1991), struck São Miguel and Santa Maria islands in the Azores as an extratropical storm.
 Hurricane Erika (1997), long-lived Category 3 hurricane that approached the Lesser Antilles before curving northward and moving into the open ocean.
 Hurricane Erika (2003), weak Category 1 hurricane that made landfall in northeastern Mexico, near the Texas-Tamaulipas border.
 Tropical Storm Erika (2009), made landfall on Guadeloupe, and dissipated southeast of Puerto Rico the following day.
 Tropical Storm Erika (2015), made landfall on Dominica; caused US$500 million in damage and 31 fatalities. 

The name Erika was retired after the 2015 season, and was replaced by Elsa for the 2021 season.

Atlantic hurricane set index articles